Paul Piaget may refer to:

 Paul Piaget (rowing) (1905–?), Swiss rowing coxswain
 Paul Piaget (actor) (1934–1985), Spanish actor